Catching Features is a sports simulation video game developed for the sport of orienteering.

Several different modes of play are available. Individual courses are run with interval starts against computer opponents, or with a mass start against many of them. Relay events allow you to run one leg of a forked relay course.

A random map generator lets you create an endless supply of maps and courses to run on. Each course you run will earn you a number of ranking points based on the other runners that day. By earning more points it is possible to unlock additional events to run.

External links
 Website of Catching Features
 Catching Features at GamesRadar
 WoO-TV & Gueorgiou: 3D Terrain Model for Orienteering TV productions
 To JWOC with Catching Features

Orienteering
Sports video games
2008 video games